WSLK (880 kHz, "Lake Radio 880") is a commercial AM radio station licensed to Moneta, Virginia.  It broadcasts an oldies and adult standards radio format and is owned and operated by Smile Broadcasting, LLC.  The studios and offices are on Village Springs Drive in Hardy, Virginia.  

WSLK is a daytimer station, powered at 900 watts non-directional.  AM 880 is a clear channel frequency reserved for Class A WCBS in New York City.  So to avoid interference, at night WSLK goes off the air.  The transmitter is off Moneta Road in Moneta.  The station's signal covers the Smith Mountain Lake area in parts of Bedford and Franklin Counties in Virginia.  Programming is heard around the clock on 250-watt FM translator W252DP at 98.3 MHz in Moneta.

History
This station received its original construction permit from the Federal Communications Commission on January 4, 1990.  The new station was assigned the call sign WBLU by the FCC on February 7, 1990.  WBLU received its license to cover from the FCC on December 18, 1991.

Smile Broadcasting LLC purchased WCQV, at the time a Southern Gospel station, from Perception Media Group in a deal announced in February 2008. The station was sold for a reported $125,000.

The station was assigned the current WSLK call sign by the FCC on April 7, 2008.

References

External links
Lake Radio 880 Online
Lake Radio Facebook

SLK
Adult standards radio stations in the United States
Oldies radio stations in the United States
Radio stations established in 1991
1991 establishments in Virginia
SLK